The 2023 Nepal Tri-Nation Series was the 21st, and last, round of the 2019–2023 ICC Cricket World Cup League 2 cricket tournament took place in Nepal in March 2023. It was a tri-nation series between Nepal, Papua New Guinea and the United Arab Emirates cricket teams, with the matches played as One Day International (ODI) fixtures. The ICC Cricket World Cup League 2 formed part of the qualification pathway to the 2023 Cricket World Cup. Going into the final series of the League 2 tournament, Nepal required four wins from four games to claim the third and final automatic place in the 2023 Cricket World Cup Qualifier, at the expense of Namibia.

Squads

Nepal named Kamal Singh Airee, Mousom Dhakal, Sundeep Jora and Arjun Saud as reserves in their squad.

Fixtures

1st ODI

2nd ODI

3rd ODI

4th ODI

5th ODI

6th ODI

References

External links
 Series home at ESPNcricinfo

2023 in Nepalese cricket
2023 in Emirati cricket
2023 in Papua New Guinean cricket
International cricket competitions in 2022–23
Nepal
Nepal Tri-Nation Series
Nepal Tri-Nation Series